Obsidian is the sixteenth studio album by British gothic metal band Paradise Lost. It was released on 15 May 2020 via Nuclear Blast. Music videos were released for the songs "Darker Thoughts" and "Fall from Grace". Metal Hammer named it as the 11th best metal album of 2020.

Track listing

Personnel

Paradise Lost
 Nick Holmes – vocals
 Greg Mackintosh – lead guitar
 Aaron Aedy – rhythm guitar
 Steve Edmondson – bass
 Waltteri Väyrynen – drums

Other personnel
Alicia Nurho – violin (1 & 7)
Heather Mackintosh – backing vocals (8)
Jaime Gomez Arellano – recording, mixing, and mastering
Federico De Luca – layout
Adrian Baxter – artwork

Charts

References

Paradise Lost (band) albums
2020 albums
Nuclear Blast albums